is a town located in Gunma Prefecture, Japan. , the town had an estimated population of 14,323 in 5717 households and a population density of 340 persons per km². Itakura's animal mascot is the catfish. It is represented in a bronze statue at Raiden Shrine, as a mikoshi in Itakura's summer festival, and also is emblazoned on the town's manhole covers. Itakura is one of the few places in Japan where catfish dishes are a local delicacy.

Geography
Itakura is located in the northern Kantō Plains in the extreme southern corner of Gunma prefecture, bordered by Saitama Prefecture to the south and Tochigi Prefecture to the north. The Tone River flows through the town, and the Watarase River forms its northern border.

Surrounding municipalities
Gunma Prefecture
 Tatebayashi
 Meiwa
Saitama Prefecture
 Hanyu
 Kazo
Tochigi Prefecture
 Sano
 Tochigi

Climate
Itakura has a Humid continental climate (Köppen Cfa) characterized by hot summers and cold winters.  The average annual temperature in Itakura is 14.3 °C. The average annual rainfall is 1303 mm with September as the wettest month. The temperatures are highest on average in August, at around 26.6 °C, and lowest in January, at around 3.3 °C.

Demographics
Per Japanese census data, the population of Itakura has declined over the past 70 years.

History
The villages of Nishiyada, Ebise, Ōgano and Inara were created within Ōra District, Gunma Prefecture on April 1, 1889 with the creation of the modern municipalities system after the Meiji Restoration. On February 1, 1955, the four villages merged to form the town of Itakura. Meiwa was raised to town status on October 1, 1998.

Government
Itakura has a mayor-council form of government with a directly elected mayor and a unicameral town council of 12 members. Itakura, together with the other municipalities in Ōra District contributes three members to the Gunma Prefectural Assembly. In terms of national politics, the town is part of Gunma 3rd district of the lower house of the Diet of Japan.

Economy
Itakura is largely a bedroom community for Tokyo and nearly Tatebayashi. About 55% of the town's area is farmland, and Itakura's main agricultural products include rice and cucumbers, though many other crops are grown locally.

Education
Itakura has two public elementary schools and one public middle schools operated by the town government, and one public high school operated by the Gunma prefecture Board of Education. Toyo University has a branch campus in Itakura.

Transportation

Railway
 Tōbu Railway – Tōbu Nikkō Line

Highway

Local attractions
 Raiden Jinja 
 Watarase-yusuichi, a UNESCO designated Ramsar Site 
 Takatori Tenmangū 
 Itakura Golf Course
 Gunma's Waterways

References

External links

Official Website 

Towns in Gunma Prefecture
Itakura, Gunma